Alakbarov (masculine) or Alakbarova (feminine) is an Azerbaijani surname, which is transliterated in Russian as Alekperov (masculine) and Alekperova (feminine). Notable people with the surname include:

Alasgar Alakbarov (1910–1963), Azerbaijani actor
Avaz Alakbarov (born 1952), Azerbaijani politician
Fizuli Alakbarov (born 1958), Azerbaijani politician
Letafet Alekperova (born 1976), Azerbaijani television host and actress
Samir Alakbarov (born 1968), Azerbaijani footballer
Shovkat Alakbarova (1922–1993), Azerbaijani singer
Vagit Alekperov (born 1950), Azerbaijani and Russian businessman
Vugar Alakbarov (born 1981), Azerbaijani boxer

Azerbaijani-language surnames